Sayyida al Hurra, real name Lalla Aicha bint Ali ibn Rashid al-Alami (1485 – 14 July 1561), was Hakimat Titwan (Governor of Tétouan) between 1515–1542 and a Moroccan privateer leader during the early 16th century. She became the wife of the Wattasid Sultan Ahmad ibn Muhammad. She is considered to be "one of the most important female figures of the Islamic West in the modern age".                                                                                         

The life of Sayyida al-Hurra can be understood within geopolitical and religious contexts, particularly the struggle between Muslim and Christian empires during her lifetime. The Muslim Ottomans had captured Constantinople in 1453, marking the end of the Roman Empire. Al-Hurra was two years old when the Portuguese started their colonial conquest by capturing some ports at the western coast of Morocco, starting the year 1487. A few years later, Granada fell into the hands of the Catholic Monarchs Isabella I of Castile and Ferdinand II of Aragon and forced conversions of Muslims in Spain followed.

Allied with the Ottoman corsair Barbarossa of Algiers, al-Hurra controlled the western Mediterranean Sea while Barbarossa controlled the east. She was also prefect of Tétouan. In 1515, she became the last person in Islamic history to legitimately hold the title of al Hurra (Queen) following the death of her husband, who ruled Tétouan. She later married the Berber King of Morocco, Ahmed al-Wattasi, but refused to leave Tétouan to do so. This marriage marks the only time in Moroccan history a king married away from the capital, Fez.

Etymology
The title Sayyida al Hurra means "noble lady who is free and independent; the woman sovereign who bows to no superior authority". Hakimat Tatwan means governor of Tétouan.

Early life
Sayyida al Hurra was born around 1485 and 1495 (Hijri around 890) or precisely in 1491, to a prominent Muslim family of Andalusian nobles, who fled to Morocco with her family when Ferdinand and Isabella conquered the Muslim kingdom of Granada in 1492, at the end of the Reconquista and settled in Chefchaouen. She was a descendant of the Moroccan sufi saint Abd al-Salam ibn Mashish al-Alami, and through him of Hasan ibn Ali. 

Sayyida's childhood was happy and secure, yet clouded by constant reminders of the forced exile from Granada. During her childhood, she was given a first-class education. She was fluent in several languages which included Castilian Spanish and Portuguese. The famous Moroccan scholar Abdallah al-Ghazwani was one of her many teachers. She was married at age 16 to a man 30 years her senior, Sidi al-Mandri II, a grandson or nephew of Ali al-Mandri who was a friend of her father and re-founder and governor of the city of Tétouan, himself an Andalusian Moorish refugee. She was promised to her husband when she was still a child.

As Governor of Tétouan
An intelligent woman, Al Hurra learned much whilst assisting her husband in his business affairs. She was a de facto vice-governor, with her husband entrusting the reins of power to her each time he made a trip outside the city. When he died in 1515, the population, who had become accustomed to seeing her exercise power, accepted her as a governor of Tétouan, giving her the title of al-Hurra. Spanish and Portuguese sources describe al-Hurra as "their partner in the diplomatic game". Some historians believe that the unusual "degree of acceptance of al Hurra as a ruler" could be attributed to "Andalusian familiarity with female inheriting power from monarch families in Spain such as Isabella I of Castile." Others believe that al Hurra succeeded as governor because she was "the undisputed leader of pirates of the western Mediterranean".

In 1541, she accepted a marriage proposal from Ahmed al-Wattasi, a Sultan of the Moroccan Wattasid dynasty, who traveled from Fez to Tétouan to marry her. Her marriage with him was the only recorded instance of a Moroccan king marrying outside of his capital. This occurred because al-Hurra was not ready to give up her role as queen of Tétouan or even to leave the city for the marriage ceremony, forcing al-Wattasi to come to her. It is believed that Sayyida al-Hurra insisted on this to show everybody that she was not going to give up governing Tétouan despite being married to the Sultan.

Sayyida al Hurra lived a life of adventure and romance. She appointed her brother Moulay Ibrahim as vizier to Ahmed al-Wattasi, Sultan of Fez, and this placed the Rashids as major players in the effort to unify Morocco against the fast-growing powers of Spain and Portugal.

As a corsair
Sayyida could neither forget nor forgive the humiliation of being forced to flee the Granada. In her wish to avenge herself on the "Christian enemy", she turned to piracy. She made contact with the legendary Ottoman admiral Hayrettin Barbarossa of Algiers. Piracy provided a quick income, "booty and ransom for captives", and also helped to keep alive the dream of returning to Andalusia. She was well respected by Christians as a queen who had power over the Mediterranean Sea, and over the release of Portuguese and Spanish captives. For example, in The Forgotten Queens of Islam Fatima Mernissi mentions Spanish historical documents of 1540, according to which there were negotiations "between the Spaniards and Sayyida al-Hurra" after a successful pirating operation in Gibraltar in which the pirates took "much booty and many prisoners".

Later life
After she had ruled as queen for 30 years, her son-in-law Muhammad al-Hassan al-Mandri overthrew her in October 1542. According to the Yemen Times, "she was stripped of her property and power". Accepting her fate, al Hurra retired to Chefchaouen, where she lived nearly 20 years more.

Relationship to California
Sayyida al-Hurra is a possible inspiration for the myth of Califia, and therefore may have indirectly inspired the name of California.

References

1480s births
1561 deaths
16th-century Moroccan people
16th-century Moroccan women
16th-century women rulers
African women in war
Barbary pirates
Moroccan female pirates
Islam and women
Moroccan pirates
People from Chefchaouen
People from Tétouan
Spouses of sultans